The title Lord Bellenden, of Broughton, was a lordship of Parliament created in the Peerage of Scotland on 10 June 1661 for William Bellenden, who was Treasurer-depute of Scotland. Shortly before his death, he resigned his peerage in favour of his first cousin twice removed, John Ker (later Bellenden). In 1804, the seventh lord inherited the dukedom of Roxburghe from his cousin. On his death in 1805, the dukedom later passed to another cousin and the lordship of Parliament became extinct.

Lords Bellenden (1661–1805)
William Bellenden, 1st Lord Bellenden (c.1604–1671)
John Bellenden, 2nd Lord Bellenden (died 1707). Youngest son of William Ker, 2nd Earl of Roxburghe.
John Bellenden, 3rd Lord Bellenden (1685–1741). Son of the 2nd Lord.
Ker Bellenden, 4th Lord Bellenden (1725–1753). Son of the 3rd Lord.
John Ker Bellenden, 5th Lord Bellenden (1751–1796). Son of the 4th Lord.
Robert Bellenden, 6th Lord Bellenden (1734–1797). Son of the 3rd Lord, and younger brother of the 4th Lord.
William Bellenden-Ker, 4th Duke of Roxburghe, 7th Lord Bellenden (1728–1805). Son of William Bellenden, and grandson of the 2nd Lord Bellenden. As the great-grandson of the 2nd Earl of Roxburghe, he became the Duke of Roxburghe upon the death of his cousin, John Ker, 3rd Duke of Roxburghe.

These relationships are delineated in the following publication:

Lodge, Edmund. "The Genealogy of the Existing British Peerage". Oxford University: Saunders and Otley, 1832. Print. Page 313. Public domain, available online.

Bellenden

Bellenden